Sweden participated at the 2014 Summer Youth Olympics in Nanjing from 16 to 28 August 2014. 32 athletes have been selected to compete at the games.

Medalists

Medalists in mixed NOCs events

Boxing

One boxer will compete for Sweden at the games after her performance at the 2014 AIBA Youth World Championships.

Diving

Sweden secured a quota place at the qualifying event in Guadalajara at 2 March 2014.

Equestrian

One athlete are qualified for the equestrian events.

Fencing

Two fencers have qualified based on the result from the 2014 Cadet World Championships.

Golf

Sweden qualified one team of two athletes based on the 8 June 2014 IGF Combined World Amateur Golf Rankings.

Individual

Team

Gymnastics

Handball

Sweden won the 2013 European Women's Youth Championships and qualified for the Youth Olympic Games.

Girls' tournament

Roster

 Joumana Chaddad
 Thess Krönell
 Emma Ekenman-Fernis
 Albana Arifi
 Sofia Hvenfelt
 Emma Lindqvist
 Julia Bardis
 Lina Wessberg
 Olivia Mellegård
 Anna Johansson
 Hanna Blomstrand
 Isabella Mouratidou
 Julia Sandell
 Emma Rask

Group stage

Semifinal

Bronze medal game

Judo

Individual

Team

Sailing

Sweden qualified one boat based on its performance at the Byte CII European Continental Qualifiers.

Swimming

Sweden has been assigned eight quota places by FINA, but decided to compete with only six athletes.

Table tennis

Elias Ranefur secured a quota place at the Road to Nanjing Series in Avarua.

Singles

Team

Qualification Legend: Q=Main Bracket (medal); qB=Consolation Bracket (non-medal)

Taekwondo

At the YOG qualifying event in Taipei at 20 March 2014, Patricia Stirner secured a quota place for Sweden after finishing in sixth place in girls' 49 kg event.

Tennis

Sweden qualified one athlete based on the 9 June 2014 ITF World Junior Rankings.

Singles

Doubles

References

2014 in Swedish sport
Nations at the 2014 Summer Youth Olympics
Sweden at the Youth Olympics